Diànbù (店埠) may refer to the following locations in China:

 Dianbu, Anhui, town in Feidong County
 Dianbu, Shandong, town in Laixi